Babe's Blues is an album by jazz group The Three Sounds featuring performances recorded in 1961 with one additional track from 1962 but not released on the Blue Note label until 1986. The title track is a composition by Randy Weston.

Reception
The Allmusic review by Scott Yanow awarded the album 4 stars, stating: "The popular Three Sounds perform mostly standards on the album, infusing their swinging music with funk, soul, and sincere feeling". The All About Jazz review by Douglas Payne stated: "Harris, aided by smooth, sympathetic bassist Andy Simpkins and subtle drummer Bill Dowdy, are in top form here, like a hip hotel lounge band with a wicked sense of the blues. Harris plumbs his specialty throughout, wresting the blues out of even the most mundane of tunes".

Track listing
All compositions by Gene Harris except as indicated

 "Babe's Blues" (Randy Weston) - 4:37
 "Wait a Minute" - 2:17
 "Work Song" (Nat Adderley) - 3:23
 "Blue Daniel" - 3:46
 "Sweet and Lovely" (Gus Arnheim, H. Tobias, Jules LeMare) - 7:25
 "Shiny Stockings" (Frank Foster) - 3:14
 "Walking the Floor Over You" (Ernest Tubb) - 2:46
 "Between the Devil and the Deep Blue Sea" (Harold Arlen, Ted Koehler) - 3:37
 "Stairway to the Stars" (Matty Malneck, Mitchell Parish, Frank Signorelli) - 6:41
 "Lazy Cat" - 4:51

Recorded on August 13, 1961 (2–10) and March 8, 1962 (1).

Personnel
Gene Harris - piano
Andrew Simpkins - bass
Bill Dowdy - drums

References

Blue Note Records albums
The Three Sounds albums
1986 albums
Albums recorded at Van Gelder Studio